Saving the Queen is a 1976 American spy thriller novel by William F. Buckley, Jr., the first of eleven novels in the Blackford Oakes series.

Plot
This novel, set in 1952, reveals Oakes's childhood and educational background, his recruitment into the CIA, and the Agency's procedures for "handling" him.  His first assignment sends him to Britain, where he must identify (and deal with) a high-level security leak close to the (fictional) British monarch, Queen Caroline. Also, Rufus, the enigmatic genius behind American intelligence operations, is introduced.

See also
 List of Blackford Oakes novels
 William F. Buckley, Jr. bibliography

References
Citations

Bibliography

 
 

1976 American novels
Blackford Oakes novels
Doubleday (publisher) books
Fiction set in 1952